The Beitou Refuse Incineration Plant is an incinerator in Zhoumei Borough, Beitou District, Taipei, Taiwan.

History
The plant was originally established as the Shilin Refuse Incineration Plant on 1 July 1991. On 1 July 1995, the plant was renamed Beitou Refuse Incineration Plant and it was made a unit of the Department of Environmental Protection of the Taipei City Government.

Technical details
The plant spans over an area of 10.6 hectares. It can treat 1,800 tons of garbage from the Taipei area per day.

Facilities
The plant's smokestack is equipped with an observation deck at an altitude of 116 meters. On 1 January 2000, a revolving restaurant opened above it (claimed to be world's first restaurant on a waste incinerator chimney), which seats 120 guests and is powered by energy from the incinerator.

Transportation
The plant is accessible within walking distance southwest of Shipai Station of Taipei Metro.

See also
 Air pollution in Taiwan
 Waste management in Taiwan
Neihu Refuse Incineration Plant, also located in Taipei

References

External links

  

1991 establishments in Taiwan
Incinerators in Taipei
Infrastructure completed in 1991